This is a discography of the band Traffic.

Albums

Studio albums

Live albums

Compilation albums
 Best of Traffic – 1969 US #48, AUS #12
 Heavy Traffic – 1975 US #155
 More Heavy Traffic – 1975 US #193
 Smiling Phases – 1991
 Heaven Is in Your Mind - An Introduction to Traffic – 1998
 Feelin' Alright: The Very Best of Traffic (aka The Definitive Collection) – 2000
 The Collection – 2002
 The Best of Traffic - The Millennium Collection (20th Century Masters series) – 2003
 Traffic Gold – 2005

Singles

Guest appearances as a group

Notes

References 

Discographies of British artists
Rock music group discographies
Discography